East Journey are a rock/reggae band from North East Arnhem Land, Northern Territory. They combined modern and traditional music and sing in both English and Yolŋu.

History
The band formed in 2010, and their debut album Guwak was released on 30 March 2012. They have had airplay on Triple J and Radio Australia, and had several nominations and wins at the National Indigenous Music Awards between 2012 and 2015.

In 2015 they collaborated with Yothu Yindi on a project called Genesis, which included an EP and a performance at the National Indigenous Music Awards 2015.

In June 2021 they played at the Yarrapay Festival, at Buku-Larrnggay Mulka Art Centre in Yirrkala, along with Yothu Yindi, the Andrew Gurruwiwi Band, and Yirrmal.

Discography

Albums

Singles

National Indigenous Music Awards
The National Indigenous Music Awards recognise excellence, innovation and leadership among Aboriginal and Torres Strait Islander musicians from throughout Australia. They commenced in 2004.

|-
| rowspan="4"| 2012
| themselves
| G.R. Bururrawanga Memorial Award
| 
|-
| rowspan="3"| "Ngarrpiya"
| Film Clip of the Year
| 
|-
| Song of the Year
| 
|-
| Cover Art of the Year
| 
|-
| 2014
| themselves
| Best New Talent
| 
|-
| rowspan="4"| 2015
| The Genesis Project
| Album of the Year
| 
|-
| rowspan="2"| "Song of Arnhem Land"
| Film Clip of the Year
| 
|-
| Cover Art of the Year
| 
|-
| Traditional Song of the Year
| "Mokuy & Bonba" 
| 
|-

References

External links
Archived East Journey website

Northern Territory musical groups
Indigenous Australian musical groups